Uniramia (uni – one, ramus – branch, i.e. single-branches) is a group within the arthropods. In the past this group included the Onychophora, which are now considered a separate category. The group is currently used in a narrower sense.

Uniramia is one of three subphyla in the Arthropoda classification suggested by Sidnie Manton. This classification divided arthropods into a three-phyla  polyphyletic group, with phylum Uniramia including the Hexapoda (insects), Myriapoda (centipedes and millipedes) and the Onychophora (velvetworms). The discovery of fossil lobopods, determined to be intermediate between onychophorans and arthropods led to the splintering of the Lobopoda and Onychophora into separate groups.  This redefined the Uniramia as strictly "true" arthropods with exoskeletons and jointed appendages. Uniramians have strictly uniramous appendages.

Systematics can result in rival taxonomies, and this seems to have happened to Uniramia. The name Uniramia was temporarily rejected as a polyphyletic group, but when used now refers to the subphylum consisting of the insects + myriapods. Subphylum Uniramia is characterized by uniramous (single-branching) appendages, one pair of antennae and two pairs of mouthparts (single pairs of mandibles and maxillae). Their body forms and ecologies are diverse. While most unirames are terrestrial, "some are aquatic for part or all of their life cycles." Atelocerata is described as replacing Uniramia in early twentieth-century texts (Heymons, 1901), where it was the preferred name for the category uniting the Hexapoda (insects) + Myriapoda; but depending on the source, the term Atelocerata may have replaced Mandibulata, be an infraphylum beneath Mandibulata, or may no longer be a valid category after closer, cladistics-based genetic study.

The Crustacea were generally considered the closest relatives of the Uniramia, and sometimes these were united as Mandibulata. However, the competing hypothesis — that Crustacea and Hexapoda form a monophyletic group, the Pancrustacea, to which the Myriapoda are the closest relatives — has support from molecular and fossil evidence.

Notes

References
 Paleos Metazoa: Arthropoda: Uniramia
 Bio 105–106 demo

External links
 A Cladistic Analysis of Arthropoda:  Examining the Evolution of Biramous Appendages and Mandibles, Katherine McBride, Lindsey Moll, Whitney Zurat, Susquehanna University
 Uniramia at palaeos

Arthropod taxonomy
Animal subphyla